"Right Now" is a song by Barbadian recording artist Rihanna from her seventh studio album, Unapologetic (2012). The song features French disc jockey David Guetta. Rihanna co-wrote the song with R&B singers Ne-Yo and The-Dream, while their longtime collaborators, Norwegian production duo Stargate, co-produced the track alongside Guetta and his own longtime collaborators Nicky Romero and Giorgio Tuinfort. It was sent to contemporary hit and rhythmic contemporary radios in the United States as the fourth single from the album on May 28, 2013. Musically, "Right Now" is an EDM and pop song. The lyrical content features Rihanna chanting to live life in the moment.

The song garnered a mostly positive response from music critics, many of whom deemed it one of the highlights of Unapologetic, some critics were also divided by the song calling it safe. Upon the release of Unapologetic, "Right Now" charted in many countries worldwide, including the top ten of the UK Dance Chart. "Right Now" debuted at number 90 on the US Billboard Hot 100, reaching a peak of 50. Furthermore, it has topped the US Hot Dance Club Songs chart becoming Rihanna's twentieth number one on the chart, thus surpassing Janet Jackson's tally. The song performed well in Australia where it was certified Platinum by the Australian Recording Industry Association (ARIA).

No music video was shot for the song, and it received no televised performances as part of promotion. However, the song was used as the promotional musical backdrop for the coverage of the 2013 NBA Playoffs and was used by  lager company Budweiser as part of their global "Made For Music" campaign co-starring Jay-Z. The song was also remixed by mash-up artist DJ Earworm.

Background
Rihanna began "working on the new sound" for her seventh studio album in March 2012, even though she had not yet begun recording. On September 12, 2012, Def Jam France announced via Twitter that Rihanna would release a new single the upcoming week while her seventh studio album was scheduled to be released in November 2012. However, the tweet was shortly deleted and replaced with another clarifying that "more information will be made available tomorrow, Thursday, September 13". Via her official Twitter account, Rihanna posted series of "teasing" tweets announcing her seventh studio album.

Production and composition

During the production process of Unapologetic, Rihanna wrote on her Twitter account that there was a secret collaboration featured on the album, and that the collaborator's birthday is on November 7. She later explicitly revealed the artist to be French disk-jockey David Guetta, announcing that he produced "Right Now" and another song "Phresh Out the Runway" for the album. Rihanna and Guetta previously collaborated on "Who's That Chick?" (2010), which is included in the re-release of his second studio album One Love (2009), titled One More Love (2010).

"Right Now" was written by Rihanna, David Guetta, Ne-Yo, The-Dream, Giorgio Tuinfort, Nicky Romero, and Norwegian production duo Stargate. Production, instrumentation, and programming for the song were handled by Guetta, Romero, Tuinfort, and Stargate. The record engineers were Paul Norris and Aamir Yaqub, who were assisted by Xavier Stephenson at Metropolis Studios in London. Rihanna's vocals were recorded by Marcus Tovar and Kuk Harrell at R Studios in Los Angeles, California, while it was mixed by Manny Marroquin at Larrabee Studios in Burbank, California and Romero at White Villa Studios in Ede, Netherlands. Harrell also handled production of Rihanna's vocals.

According to Christina Lee of Idolator, the song features a "churning bassline."
According to the sheet music published at Musicnotes.com, the song is written in the key of E minor with a moderately fast tempo of 130 beats per minute.  "Right Now" follows the chord progression Em−C−Am−Bm7, and Rihanna's vocals span from A3 to D5.

Critical reception
The song received mostly positive reviews from critics, deeming it as one of the standout tracks on Unapologetic. Smokey Fontaine for The Huffington Post praised the collaboration between Rihanna and Guetta, writing Right Now' is a future No. 1 that sounds so obvious because... it's so good." Jon Caramanica for The New York Times positively critiqued the song, as well as the other Guetta produced track "Phresh Out the Runway" on the album, as they are "appealingly guttural" despite sounding harsh. Christina Lee for Idolator described the song as a "highlight" on Unapologetic, while Robert Copsey for Digital Spy labelled it as "safe". Genevieve Koski for The A.V. Club gave the song a mixed review.

Commercial performance
Upon the release of Unapologetic, "Right Now" charted in several territories due to strong digital downloads. It debuted on the Irish Singles Chart at number 77 on November 22, 2012. The song re-entered the chart on June 6, 2013, at number 78. In the United Kingdom, "Right Now" debuted on the UK Singles Chart at number 36 on November 25. It also subsequently entered the UK Dance Chart at number seven in the same chart issue. In Scotland, the song debuted at number 25 on November 25, 2012, eleven places higher than its UK-wide position. Elsewhere in Europe, the song peaked at number 43 in Germany and 32 in Switzerland at number 32. "Right Now" also debuted at number 32 on the Canadian Hot 100 chart.

On February 25, 2013, "Right Now" entered the Australian Singles Chart at number 39. The song was later certified platinum in the country for sales of 70,000 copies. On June 10, 2013, "Right Now" entered the US Mainstream Top 40 chart at number 37. The debut scored Rihanna a record-extending thirty-sixth entry, extending her lead as the artist with most appearances on the chart since 1992. On August 8, 2013, "Right Now" reached number one on the US Dance Club Songs chart, marking Rihanna's 20th chart topper of her career. With the feat, Rihanna moved into second place, ahead of Janet Jackson who has 19 leaders, among artists with the most number ones in the chart's 37-year history. Rihanna trails only Madonna, with 43 number ones.

Usage in media
From April 2013, Turner Sports began using "Right Now" as the promotional musical backdrop for its coverage of the 2013 NBA Playoffs. On July 2, 2013, mash-up artist DJ Earworm released a summer mix incorporating "Right Now" with other tracks released around the same period. Also in the same month, lager production company Budweiser announced that Rihanna had become a part of their global "Made For Music" campaign, also co-starring Jay-Z. A commercial video was released featuring the singer and "Right Now".

Track listing

Credits and personnel
Recording
Recorded at Metropolis Studios, London, UK; R Studios, Los Angeles, California.
Mixed at White Villa Studios, Ede, Netherlands; Larrabbee Studios, Burbank, California.

Personnel

Lead vocals – Rihanna
Featured artist – David Guetta
Songwriting – Terius Nash, Robyn Fenty, David Guetta, Mikkel S. Eriksen, Tor Erik Hermansen, Shaffer Smith, Giorgio Tuinfort, Nick Rotteveel
Production – David Guetta, Stargate, Nicky Romero, Giorgio Tuinfort
Recording engineers – Paul Norris, Aamir Yaqub

Assistant vocal engineer – Xavier Stephenson
Vocal production – Kuk Harrell
Vocal recording – Kuk Harrell, Marcos Tovar
Mixing – Nicky Romero, Manny Marroquin
All instruments and programming – David Guetta, Stargate, Nicky Romero, Giorgio Tuinfort

Credits adapted from the liner notes of Unapologetic, Def Jam Recordings, SRP Records.

Charts

Weekly charts

Year-end charts

Certifications

Release history

See also
List of Billboard Dance Club Songs number ones of 2013

References

2013 singles
2012 songs
Rihanna songs
Songs written by The-Dream
Songs written by Ne-Yo
Songs written by Tor Erik Hermansen
Songs written by Mikkel Storleer Eriksen
Songs written by Rihanna
Songs written by David Guetta
Song recordings produced by Stargate (record producers)
Songs written by Giorgio Tuinfort
Def Jam Recordings singles
Song recordings produced by David Guetta